Ubuntu Budgie is an official community flavor of Ubuntu. It combines the Ubuntu-based system with the independently developed Budgie desktop environment.

History
Ubuntu Budgie started out as an unofficial community flavor in parallel with Ubuntu 16.04 LTS, referred to as "budgie-remix". budgie-remix 16.10 was later released by strictly following the time frame issued for Ubuntu 16.10.

It was eventually recognized as an official community flavor of Ubuntu, and was rebranded as Ubuntu Budgie.

In November 2017, Vincenzo Bovino was hired as the new brand and PR Manager.

Ubuntu Budgie 17.04 was released in April 2017, and was updated to version 17.10 in October 2017.

32-bit support was removed in Ubuntu Budgie and Ubuntu MATE with the 18.10 release.

Releases

budgie-remix 16.04
budgie-remix 16.04 was released on April 25, 2016, four days after the release of Ubuntu 16.04.

The system contains Budgie Desktop 10.2.5. Has a window manager based on Mutter, a customizable panel, notification center settings. The Arc-GTK+ theme is used. Compared to Ubuntu 16.04, budgie-remix has Nautilus version 3.18, as at that time Ubuntu had a version of GNOME Files 3.14. It includes a dock-panel Plank version 0.11.1, gedit version 3.18, GNOME 3.18 photos, gThumb 3.4.3, Rhythmbox 3.3, GNOME Videos 3.18, GNOME Terminal 3.18, LibreOffice 5.1.2, Mozilla Firefox 45.0, Transmission 2.84, GTK+ 3.18.9, Mesa 11.2.0, X.Org 1.18.3 and the Linux kernel 4.4.0.

budgie-remix 16.10
budgie-remix 16.10 was released on October 16, 2016, three days after the release of Ubuntu 16.10.

This version contains a shell Budgie Desktop 10.2.7, GTK+ 3.22, the Linux kernel 4.8. There are many new features implemented in this version, such as full disk encryption, home folder encryption, and support for multiple languages during installation. It features the theme of design Arc-GTK+, a new theme icons Pocillo.

One of the developers of budgie-remix, David Mohammed, says:

Ubuntu Budgie 17.04
Ubuntu Budgie 17.04 was released on April 19, 2017. The name, budgie-remix, was rebranded as of this release after the distribution became official for the Ubuntu community.
This version included the Budgie Desktop 10.2.9 shell, the Linux 4.10 kernel and Mesa 17.0.3, X.Org 1.19.3. It shipped with an updated version Budgie-Welcome application, support for application indicator appeared, sound applets were managed, GNOME 3.24 applications were enabled, GNOME Terminal was replaced with Termix and Chromium replaced Google Chrome, and GTK+ theme support for Qt was enabled. Use the theme of the design Arc-GTK+, the theme of the icons Moka.

In the record about the release of this version, it was written as follows:

Ubuntu Budgie 17.10
Ubuntu Budgie 17.10 was released on October 19, 2017.

It includes the Budgie Desktop 10.4 shell, the Linux 4.13 kernel. The Budgie 10.4 desktop environment is equipped with a set of native features which include a new stylish Alt-Tab, support for Spotify in Raven, support for switching window controls to the left or right, support for SMB files and encrypted volumes through the addition of applets and supports customizing the appearance of dates and times. In addition, there is support for left or right side panels in Budgie Desktop 10.4, support for converting panels in the dock, transparency and dynamic auto-image for all panels, and the ability to replenish the bottom panel to work without a horrible "jump" effect. Other noteworthy improvements in the release of Ubuntu Budgie 17.10 include Night Light and Caffeine tools, Tilix as the default terminal emulator instead of Termix, as well as support for Tilix Quake mode with the F12 key, updated panel icons and new wallpapers.

On December 20, 2017, Canonical withdrew the Ubuntu 17.10 distribution and hid the download link on their official website due to a critical bug which was responsible for damaging BIOS on some Lenovo notebook models and one Acer model.

On January 12, 2018, version 17.10.1 was released, which fixed bugs included in the original 17.10 release.

Ubuntu Budgie 18.04
Ubuntu Budgie was released on April 26, 2018.

This version includes the Linux 4.15 kernel. It became possible to install OpenVNC through networkManager. New applets have appeared, such as Quick Note for notes, DropBy for downloading and viewing data from USB devices, Hot Corners for moving windows to the corner of the screen, Windowpreviews for viewing open windows, Clockworks for viewing several time zones, Autoswitch for tying the keyboard layout to the application and Window Mover in order to quickly move the window to another virtual desktop. All GNOME applications have been updated to version 3.28. However, GNOME Files has been updated to version 3.26.

References

External links

Ubuntu derivatives
X86-64 Linux distributions
Linux distributions